The Mineral Springs Community Building is a historic multiuse civic building on County Road 34 (Green Road) in rural Washington County, Arkansas east of West Fork.  It is a modest single-story wood-frame structure, with a gable roof, clapboard siding, and a stone foundation.  It was builtin 1915 and enlarged in 1947, giving it its present T shape.  The building served the local community as a school, town meeting hall, and church, with the use as a school ending in 1946.  The building is a significant example of a surviving one-room schoolhouse in the county.

The building was listed on the National Register of Historic Places in 1998.

See also
National Register of Historic Places listings in Washington County, Arkansas

References

Churches on the National Register of Historic Places in Arkansas
City and town halls on the National Register of Historic Places in Arkansas
School buildings on the National Register of Historic Places in Arkansas
Buildings and structures completed in 1915
City halls in Arkansas
National Register of Historic Places in Washington County, Arkansas
One-room schoolhouses in Arkansas
Schools in Washington County, Arkansas
1915 establishments in Arkansas
Bungalow architecture in Arkansas
American Craftsman architecture in Arkansas